Cyprus–Qatar relations refer to the bilateral relations between Cyprus and Qatar. Qatar is represented in Cyprus through its embassy in Nicosia, Cyprus. Cyprus is represented in Qatar through its embassy in Doha, Qatar.

History
Relations between the two countries began in the mid-1950s when Cypriot businessmen invested in and set up businesses in Qatar.

Diplomatic representation
The Qatari embassy opened in Nicosia in 2007. Sultan Ibrahim Al-Mahmoud is the current ambassador to Cyprus. Cyprus opened its embassy in Doha in 2003; it was the first Cypriot embassy in a GCC country. The current ambassador is Charalambos Panayides.

Diplomatic cooperation
The highest level visit from Qatar took place in April 2010, when Qatari emir Hamad bin Khalifa Al Thani visited Cyprus. A preliminary agreement for a joint real estate venture was signed during this visit. In May 2011, Cyprus and Qatar finalized the agreement. The agreement concluded a development project opposite of the Hilton Hotel in Nicosia which involved the construction of a five-star hotel, a shopping mall, offices and apartments.

In statements to the press, President Christofias said bilateral relations and ways to enhance them were discussed during the talks, and that the joint investment with Qatari Diar was of great importance, noting that it indicated the high level of relations and the rapid development of cooperation between the two countries.

Cyprus' imports from Qatar nearly doubled from 2006 to 2010, whereas its exports increased by more than 50%. In 2010, Qatar was Cyprus' twenty-second largest importer.

See also
 Foreign relations of Cyprus 
 Foreign relations of Qatar

References

See also 
 List of diplomatic missions of Cyprus
 List of diplomatic missions of Qatar

 
Qatar
Bilateral relations of Qatar